Ümmügülsüm Sultan may refer to:

 Ümmügülsüm Sultan (?–after 1622), Ottoman princess, daughter of Sultan Mehmed III
 Ümmügülsüm Sultan (?–1654), Ottoman princess, daughter of Sultan Ibrahim
 Ümmügülsüm Sultan (daughter of Mehmed IV) ( 1677 –c.1720), Ottoman princess
 Ümmügülsüm Sultan (daughter of Ahmed III) (1708–1732), Ottoman princess